The Ravenscroft Cottages, also known as Jesus Hospital, are grade II listed almshouses in Wood Street, Chipping Barnet. The houses were built in 1672 but rebuilt in the 19th century.

References

External links

Grade II listed buildings in the London Borough of Barnet
Houses in the London Borough of Barnet
Almshouses in London
Ravenscroft family
Wood Street, Chipping Barnet